Sheykh Ali Mahalleh may refer to:
 Sheykh Ali Mahalleh, Gilan
 Sheykh Ali Mahalleh, Mazandaran